The Eparchy of Parassala is a Syro-Malankara Catholic Church ecclesiastical territory or eparchy of the Catholic Church in India. It was established by Pope Francis on 5 August 2017. It covers Syro-Malankara Catholics in Tamil Nadu and Kerala. Its first and current eparch is Thomas Mar Eusebius. The Eparchy of Parassala is a suffragan eparchy in the ecclesiastical province of the metropolitan Archeparchy of Trivandrum

References

Syro-Malankara Catholic dioceses
Eastern Catholic dioceses in India
Christian organizations established in 2017
2017 establishments in Kerala